The Blue Lagoon is a romance novel written by Henry De Vere Stacpoole and was first published by T. Fisher Unwin in 1908. It is the first novel of the Blue Lagoon trilogy, which also includes The Garden of God (1923) and The Gates of Morning (1925). The novel has inspired several film adaptations, most notably the 1980 film The Blue Lagoon starring Brooke Shields and Christopher Atkins.

Plot summary
The story centers on two cousins, Dick and Emmeline Lestrange, who are marooned with a galley cook on an island in the South Pacific following a shipwreck. The galley cook, Paddy Button, assumes responsibility for the children and teaches them how to survive, cautioning them to avoid the "arita" berries, which he calls "the never-wake-up berries".

Two and a half years after the shipwreck, Paddy dies following a drinking binge. The children survive on their resourcefulness and the bounty of their remote paradise. They live in a hut and spend their days fishing, swimming, diving for pearls and exploring the island.

As the years pass, Dick and Emmeline grow into physically mature young adults and begin to fall in love. Ignorant of their human sexuality, they do not understand or know how to express their physical attraction to one another. Eventually, they consummate their relationship. The author, Henry De Vere Stacpoole, describes their sexual encounter as having been "conducted just as the birds conduct their love affairs. An affair absolutely natural, absolutely blameless and without sin. It was a marriage according to nature, without feast or guests".

Dick becomes very attentive toward Emmeline, listening to her stories and bringing her gifts. Over several months they make love often and eventually Emmeline becomes pregnant. The couple does not understand the physical changes happening to Emmeline's body and have no knowledge of childbirth. When the day comes for delivery, Emmeline disappears into the forest and returns with a child. They discover over time that the baby requires a name and they call him "Hannah" because they have only ever known an infant called by that name.

Dick and Emmeline teach Hannah how to swim, fish, throw spears and play in the mud. They survive a violent tropical cyclone and other natural hazards of island life.

Back in San Francisco, Arthur, Dick's father and Emmeline's uncle, believes the two are still alive and is determined to find them, after recognizing a child's tea set belonging to Emmeline which was retrieved by a whaler on an island. Arthur finds a captain willing to take him to the island and they set out.

Meanwhile, Dick, Emmeline and Hannah row their lifeboat to the place where they had once lived with Paddy as children. Emmeline breaks a branch off the deadly arita plant as Dicky cuts bananas on the shore. While in the boat with her son, Emmeline fails to notice that Hannah has tossed one of the oars into the sea. The tide comes in and sweeps the boat into the lagoon, leaving Emmeline and Hannah stranded. As Dicky swims to them, he is pursued by a shark. Emmeline strikes the shark with the remaining oar, earning Dick time to climb into the boat safely.

Although they are not far from shore, the trio cannot get back without the oars and they are unable to retrieve them from the water because of the shark. The boat is then caught in the current and drifts out to sea; all the while Emmeline still grasps the arita branch.

Sometime later, Arthur's ship comes across the lifeboat and finds the three unconscious but still breathing. The arita branch is now bare save for one berry. Arthur asks, "Are they dead?" and the captain replies, "No, sir. They are asleep". The ambiguous ending leaves it uncertain whether or not they can be revived.

Characters
 Emmeline Lestrange: a shipwrecked orphan, the heroine
 Dick Lestrange: Emmeline's cousin, a shipwrecked orphan, the hero
 Paddy Button: the galley cook of the wrecked ship 
 Arthur Lestrange: Dick's father and Emmeline's uncle
 Hannah: Dick and Emmeline's son

Films
Six films have been based on this novel:
 The Blue Lagoon (1923), a silent film directed by W. Bowden and Dick Cruickshanks, starring Molly Adair and Dick Cruickshanks (lost)
 The Blue Lagoon (1949), directed by Frank Launder, starring Jean Simmons and Donald Houston; currently owned by ITV Studios through The Rank Organisation film library
 The Blue Lagoon (1980), directed by Randal Kleiser, starring Brooke Shields and Christopher Atkins; released by Columbia Pictures
 Pengantin Pantai Biru (1983), an Indonesian adaptation 
 Return to the Blue Lagoon (1991), directed by William A. Graham, starring Brian Krause and Milla Jovovich; released by Columbia Pictures 
 Blue Lagoon: The Awakening (2012); produced by Sony Pictures Television for Lifetime

See also
 State of nature

References

External links
 
 
 Primordial, and Three Laws & the Golden Rule by Morgan Robertson. These 1898 stories, which first appeared in Harper's monthly, are considered by some fans and scholars to be precursors to The Blue Lagoon. Some editions of The Blue Lagoon include Primordial in the appendix, the editors believing that Stacpoole may have been inspired by it.
 Fans of Edgar Rice Burroughs also acknowledge Robertson's contribution to Stacpoole's work as they study how both stories influenced Burroughs in the creation of Tarzan of the Apes. The Ape-Man, His Kith and Kin by Georges Doddes, published in Erbzine, is a collection of stories and references to stories about shipwrecked, feral children predating the Tarzan novels. The Blue Lagoon and Primordial/ Three Laws & the Golden Rule are reprinted in their entirety.

1908 British novels
British romance novels
Castaways in fiction
Incest in fiction
Irish novels adapted into films
Novels by Henry De Vere Stacpoole
Novels about survival skills
Novels set in Oceania
Novels set on islands
Works about cousins
Works about children
Juvenile sexuality in books
Fictional feral children
Fictional English people
Fictional children